Leonard Alfred Gaynor (22 September 1925 – 26 September 2017) was an English professional footballer who made 132 appearances in the Football League playing as an inside forward for Hull City, Bournemouth & Boscombe Athletic, Southampton, Aldershot and Oldham Athletic. He also played non-league football for Giltbrook Villa, Ilkeston Town, Brinsley, Eastwood Colliery, Yeovil Town and Cambridge City.

Gaynor was born in Ollerton, Nottinghamshire, in 1925 and died in Bournemouth, Dorset, in 2017 at the age of 92.

References

1925 births
2017 deaths
People from Ollerton
Footballers from Nottinghamshire
English footballers
Association football inside forwards
Ilkeston Town F.C. (1945) players
Hull City A.F.C. players
AFC Bournemouth players
Southampton F.C. players
Aldershot F.C. players
Oldham Athletic A.F.C. players
Yeovil Town F.C. players
Cambridge City F.C. players
English Football League players
Southern Football League players